The Australian Association for Jewish Studies (AAJS) is a scholarly organization in Australia that promotes academic Jewish Studies. AAJS was founded in 1987 and held its first annual conference that year in Melbourne. AAJS is Australia's national association for tertiary academics, Jewish educators, researchers, curators, students and others devoted to the study of any aspect of Jewish life, thought and culture. 

Since February 2017, the president of the association has been Professor Ghil'ad Zuckermann. The current vice-presidents are Dr Lynne Swarts (NSW) and Dr Anna Hirsh (Victoria).

AAJS annual conferences have been held all over Australia, for example Canberra (ACT Jewish Community, 2021), Sydney (Sydney Jewish Museum, 2020, 2017; UNSW and Shalom College, 2015), Melbourne (Monash University, 2019; Deakin University, 2022), Perth (St Catherine’s College, University of Western Australia, 2018), Brisbane (Griffith University, 2016) and Adelaide (The University of Adelaide, 2014).

AAJS is the publisher of the Australian Journal of Jewish Studies.

Australian Journal of Jewish Studies 
The Australian Journal of Jewish Studies (AJJS) is the leading journal of Jewish studies in Australia. It is an international, peer-reviewed journal published annually by the Australian Association for Jewish Studies. The Journal is devoted to the study of Jewish culture in all aspects and all periods.

The journal was founded in 1987, when it was called Menorah: Australian Journal of Jewish Studies. Dr Evan Zuesse was the founding editor. In 1991 Dr Rachael Kohn became editor, and the journal changed its name to Australian Journal of Jewish Studies. The next editor was Dr Rodney Gouttman. Two editors from 2000 to 2009, Dr Dvir Abramovich and Professor Ziva Shavitsky, were succeeded by Dr Myer Samra. 

The current editors are Dr Jan Láníček and Dr Jennifer Creese.

Presidents of the Association
 Ghil'ad Zuckermann (2017-)
 Evan Zuesse (1987-1989)
 William Rubinstein (1989-1991)
 Paul R. Bartrop (1991-1993)
 Suzanne Rutland
 Dvir Abramovich
 Michael Abrahams-Sprod

See also
 History of the Jews in Australia
  Australian Jewish Historical Society
 Australian Jewish Genealogical Society

References

External links
 Official Website of AAJS

Professional associations based in Australia
Jewish studies research institutes
Research institutes established in 1987
Jewish Australian history
Jews and Judaism in Melbourne
Jews and Judaism in Sydney
1987 establishments in Australia
Historical societies of Australia
Presidents of the Australian Association for Jewish Studies
Jews and Judaism in Australia
Jewish culture